The International Thriller Writers Awards are awarded by International Thriller Writers at the annual Thrillerfest conferences for outstanding work in the field since 2006.

Award winners

References

External links
International Thriller Writers Awards, official website
Current and Past Thriller Awards 

Fiction awards
International literary awards
Awards established in 2006